Eastman Color Positive (ECP) is a photographic processing system created by Kodak in the 1950s for the development of monopack color positive print for direct projection motion picture film stock.  It is part of the Eastmancolor family of products sold by Kodak.

ECP is not used for positive intermediate films because these are "pre-print" elements (e.g. archival or "protection" elements) and are never used for direct projection. One essential difference is the presence of an orange "mask" (i.e., effectively an orange base) on all films processed by ECN, and no "mask" (i.e., effectively a clear base) on all films processed by ECP.

The original process, known as ECP-1, was used from the 1950s to the mid-1970s, and involved development at approximately 25°C for around 7–9 minutes. Later research enabled faster development and environmentally friendlier film and process (and thus quicker photo lab turnaround time).

This process allowed a higher development temperature of 41.1°C for around three minutes. This new environmentally friendly development process is known as ECP-2.  It is the standard development process for all modern motion picture color print developing, including Fuji and other non-Kodak film manufacturers. All film stocks are specifically created for a particular development process, thus ECP-1 film could not be put into an ECP-2 development bath since the designs are incompatible.

Originally, all Eastman Color films, ECN and ECP alike, were on triacetate base (no Eastman Color films were ever made on nitrate base), but recent practice has been for ECN elements to be on triacetate base, so these may be easily spliceable (using lap-type cemented splices, also called "negative assembly" splices), and for ECP elements to be on polyester base, so these are not spliceable (except by using butt-type splices with polyester splicing tapes).

References
Hanson, Wesley T. Jr. "Color Negative and Color Positive Film for Motion Picture Use." Journal of the SMPTE, March 1952, Volume 58, pages 223–238.

Kodak
Photographic film processes